Captured is the third studio album (fourth overall) by Filipino singer Christian Bautista, released in the Philippines on July 20, 2008 by Warner Music Philippines. The album consists of twelve tracks, including a duet with Sitti, which is also the title track. Its singles include "The One Who Won My Heart", "Captured", and "Limutin na Lang". The album has reached Platinum status by the Philippine Association of the Record Industry, selling over 30,000 units in the country.

Background
After nearly two years since the release of his last album Just a Love Song... Live! in 2006, Christian Bautista started working on a new album, Captured. In a press release by Warner Music Philippines, Bautista explained: 

For the first time since his debut in the Philippine music industry, he collaborated with other legendary male Filipino artists such as Martin Nievera and Ogie Alcasid, who wrote songs for the album. His brother, Joshua, also wrote a song, "Hope", for the album.

Track listing
All tracks were produced by Neil Gregorio.

Personnel
Credits were taken from Titik Pilipino.

 Pam Arrieta (with Bluesub String Section) - violins and cello
 Jim Baluyut - executive producer
 Christian Bautista - lead vocals, back-up vocals
 Joseph De Vera - album cover layout
 Janette Dela Fuente - stylist
 Gian Espiritu - grooming
 Neil Gregorio - album producer, A&R administration, additional string section arrangement, vocal supervision, mastering and sequencing
 Arnie Mendaros - vocal supervision
 Noel Mendez - acoustic and electric guitars
 Carlo Orosa - vocal supervision
 Moy Ortiz - vocal supervision
 Aldwin Perez (with Bluesub String Section) - violins and cello
 Paolo Pineda - photography
 Angee Rozul - vocals, guitars and strings section recording, mixing
 Efren San Pedro - grand piano recording
 Sitti - lead vocals (track 11)
 Thor - vocal supervision
 Bobby Velasco - drums
 Zebedee Zuniga - vocal supervision

Certifications

References

2008 albums
Christian Bautista albums